Air Transport Charter (C.I.) Limited was a Jersey based charter and cargo airline from 1947 to 1950.

History 
The company was formed in 1947 to carry out passenger and cargo charters from the Channel Islands mainly to England. Operations ceased in 1950.

Fleet 
 de Havilland Dragon Rapide
Reg'n G-AIUL, G-AGWC, G-AJWC, G-AHPT, G-AJFK, G-AFFB, 
 Douglas DC-3
Reg'n G-AJBH, G-AJVZ, G-AJBG
 Miles Aerovan

Accidents and incidents

On 20 May 1948 a Douglas Dakota 3 cargo aircraft registration G-AJBG from Valence to Bovingdon carrying fruit, crashed into a tree while doing a circuit at Bovingdon at night and in low cloud.
On 27 March 1951 a Douglas Dakota 3 cargo aircraft registered G-AJVZ en route from Ringway Airport, Manchester, England, to Nutts Corner Airport, Antrim, Northern Ireland, crashed shortly after take-off on a newspaper flight following the failure of the aircraft to gain height. There were four fatalities, two of the three crew on board and two of the three passengers.

See also
 List of defunct airlines of the United Kingdom

References

Notes

Bibliography

 

 
Defunct airlines of the United Kingdom
Airlines established in 1947
Airlines disestablished in 1950
1947 establishments in Jersey
1950 disestablishments in Jersey